Hareid Church is a parish church of the Church of Norway in the municipality of Hareid, Møre og Romsdal, Norway. It is located in the village of Hareid on the eastern side of the island of Hareidlandet. It is the church for the Hareid parish which is part of the Søre Sunnmøre prosti (deanery) in the Diocese of Møre. The white, wooden church was built in a long church design in 1877 using plans drawn up by the architects Heinrich Ernst Schirmer and Wilhelm von Hanno. The church seats about 400 people.

History
The earliest existing historical records of the church date back to 1432, but it was not new that year. The first church in Hareid was a wooden stave church was likely built in the 13th century. Around the year 1640, a timber-framed transept was built off of the north side of the nave as a way of adding more seats in the church, but also to help support the old medieval structure.

On 25 February 1806, the church was struck by lightning and it burned to the ground. It was a timber-framed, octagonal building that was designed by the local parish priest, Peder Thomas Buschmann and Elling Valbø from Ørskog was the lead builder. Work on the new church was carried out in 1807-1808 when the main building was built and enclosed with a roof. The altar, pulpit, sacristy, and windows were started, but then the work stopped for several years. The building was not completed fully until 1820.

In 1814, this church served as an election church. Together with more than 300 other parish churches across Norway, it was a polling station for elections to the 1814 Norwegian Constituent Assembly which wrote the Constitution of Norway. This was Norway's first national elections. Each church parish was a constituency that elected people called "electors" who later met together in each county to elect the representatives for the assembly that was to meet in Eidsvoll later that year.

The new church was fully completed in 1820 and it was consecrated on 25 June 1820. Soon after, it was realized that the ground under the new church site was not suitable for supporting the building. The timber structure began to sag and shift soon after its completion. After nearly 60 years of use, the church was torn down in 1876. In 1876–1877, a new church was built on the same site. The parish hired the architects Heinrich Ernst Schirmer and Wilhelm von Hanno and the lead builder was Knut Stokkeland. The new building was designed in a Romanesque Revival style and it was consecrated on 13 December 1877 by the local parish priest Christian Wisløff. On 3 January 1902, the church was struck by lightning and the ensuing fire caused significant damage, but the church was repaired soon after.

See also
List of churches in Møre

References

Hareid
Churches in Møre og Romsdal
Long churches in Norway
Wooden churches in Norway
19th-century Church of Norway church buildings
Churches completed in 1877
13th-century establishments in Norway
Norwegian election church